Count Richard Goblet d'Alviella (born 6 July 1948) is a Belgian businessman, who studied economics at the Université libre de Bruxelles, (Brussels), and obtained an MBA at the Harvard Business School. He is a son of Jean Goblet d'Alviella and his wife, June Dierdre Corfield.  He is the grandson of Sir Conrad Laurence Corfield.

On 22 July 1971, he married countess Veronique d'Oultremont.

He is a member of the board of directors of the Groupe Danone and Sofina, director and member of the audit committee of the Delhaize Group, and SES.

Sources
 Delhaize – Board of Directors
 Richard Goblet d'Alviella (Suez)

1948 births
Living people
Harvard Business School alumni
Belgian businesspeople
Richard
Université libre de Bruxelles alumni